The following is a list of female dancers by nationality – notable women who are well known for their work in the field of dance.

Africa

Algeria
 Mariquita (1830–1922), early choreographer, director and teacher in Paris, Folies Bergère, Opéra Comique

Egypt
 Naima Akef (1929–1966), belly dancer, film actress
 Nagwa Fouad (born 1939), belly dancer
 Nadia Gamal (1937–1990), belly dancer, toured widely including North America
 Samia Gamal (1924–1994), belly dancer, film actress
 Taheyya Kariokka (1919–1999), belly dancer, film actress
 Kuchuk Hanem (1850–1870), erotic dancer
 Nelly Mazloum (1929–2003), belly dancer, show dancer, folklorist, own dance company 
 Hanan Tork (born 1975), ballerina, Cairo Ballet Group, later film actress

South Africa
 Nadia Nerina (1927–2008), prima ballerina who made her glittering career with The Royal Ballet in London
 Juliet Prowse (1936–1996), Indian-born, stage dancer, starred in Can-Can
 Robyn Hendricks, ballet dancer, principal dancer, The Australian Ballet
 Phyllis Spira (1943–2008), prima ballerina, teacher, performed with Cape Town's CAPAB

Asia

Armenia
 Armen Ohanian (1887–1976), oriental dancer

Bangladesh
 Benazir Salam (born 1979), Indian classical dancer, modern dancer, Odissi teacher

China
 Dai Ailian (1916 (Trinidad)–2006), modern dancer, choreographer, teacher, first principal of Beijing Dance Academy
 Jin Xing (born 1967 to Korean parents), ballerina, modern dancer, choreographer, actress
 Faye Leung (born 1979), former principal dancer, Hong Kong Ballet
 Yuanyuan Tan (born 1974), principal dancer, San Francisco Ballet
 Xue Jinghua (born 1946), prima ballerina, National Ballet of China
 Nellie Yu Roung Ling (1889–1973), dancer and choreographer, considered the first modern dancer of China.
 Zhu Yan, prima ballerina with the National Ballet of China since 1995

Georgia
 Maia Makhateli (born c. 1986), ballet dancer, principal dancer, Dutch National Ballet
 Lila Zali (1918–2003), ballet dancer, film actress, American Ballet Theatre, Ballets Russes

India

 Shreya Rai known as (21 pink) (born 1996), Indian dancer, specializing in belly dance
 Olive Katherine Craddock (1894–1926), Anglo-Indian dancer who danced under the name of Roshanara
 Rukmini Devi Arundale (1904–1986), Bharata Natyam classical dancer, choreographer
 Methil Devika (born 1977), dancer, choreographer, teacher
 Madhuri Dixit (born 1967), film actress, dance sequences in Bollywood films
 Geeta Kapoor (born 1973), Bollywood choreographer
 Saroj Khan (born 1948), Bollywood choreographer 
 Hema Malini (born 1948), Bharata Natyam dancer, choreographer, actress
 Vaibhavi Merchant (born 1975), Bollywood dancer, choreographer
 Sujata Mohapatra (born 1968), Indian classical dancer, Odissi teacher
 Baisali Mohanty (born 1994), Indian classical dancer and choreographer of Odissi
 Rekha Raju, Mohiniyattam exponent
 Anita Ratnam (born 1954), Indian classical dancer, modern dancer, choreographer
 Mallika Sarabhai (born 1954), classical Indian dancer, choreographer
 Savitha Sastry (born 1969), Indian dancer, choreographer, specializing in Bharata Natyam
 Zohra Sehgal (1912–2014), film actress, modern dancer, choreographer
 Vyjayanthimala (born 1936), classical Indian dancer, choreographer, actress

Indonesia
 Gusmiati Suid (1942–2001), dancer and choreographer

Iran
 Farzaneh Kaboli (born 1949), Iranian folk dancer, ballet dancer, choreographer

Israel
 Rina Schenfeld (born 1938), prima ballerina, choreographer, Batsheva Dance Company

Japan
 Motofuji Akiko (1928–2003), ballerina, modern dancer
 Tae-ji Choi (born 1959), ballerina, director, teacher, Korea National Ballet
 Shizuka Gozen  (1165–1211), court dancer
 Utako Hanazono (1905–1982), modern dancer, geisha
 Yuriko Kajiya (born 1984), ballet dancer, principal dancer, Houston Ballet
 Maki Kawamura (born 1979), ballerina, New National Theatre Tokyo
 Hikaru Kobayashi (born 1976), baller dancer, former first soloist, The Royal Ballet
 Ako Kondo (born 1991), ballet dancer, The Australian Ballet
 Misa Kuranaga (born c. 1982), ballet dancer, principal dancer, San Francisco Ballet, formerly Boston Ballet
 Tamiyo Kusakari (born 1965), ballerina, film actress, Maki Asami Ballet Company
 Noriko Ohara (born 1943), ballerina, Scottish Ballet
 Masako Ono, Odissi dancer since 1996
 Shino Mori (born 1989), ballerina, National Ballet of Canada
 Yoko Morishita (born 1948), prima ballerina, director,  Matsuyama Ballet Company
 Ayako Nakano (born 1977), ballerina, soloist Theater Basel
 Madoka Sugai, ballet dancer, principal dancer, Hamburg Ballet
 Akane Takada (born  1990), ballet dancer, principal dancer, Royal Ballet
 Erina Takahashi, ballet dancer, lead principal, English National Ballet
 Yumiko Takeshima, designer and former ballet dancer
 Miyako Yoshida (born 1965), former ballet dancer, The Royal Ballet and K-ballet
 Yuriko Kimura, modern dancer, lead principal with Martha Graham Dance Company

Kazakhstan
 Nadezhda Gracheva (born 1969), prima ballerina, Bolshoi Ballet

Lebanon 
 Layal Abboud (born 1982),  concert dancer

Nepal
Bandana Nepal (born 2001), record-breaking marathon dancer

Pakistan
 Suhaee Abro, dancer since 2001, Indian classical dancer, modern dancer, choreographer
 Nargis (born 1974), film actress, stage dancer

South Korea
 Yuhui Choe, ballet dancer, first soloist, The Royal Ballet
 Ji-Young Kim (born 1978), prima ballerina, Korean National Ballet
 Kang Sue-jin (born 1967), ballerina, Stuttgart Ballet
 Kim Joo-won (born 1976), prima ballerina, Korean National Ballet
 EunWon Lee, prima ballerina, Korean National Ballet
 Young Soon Hue (born 1963), ballerina, choreographer, Deutsche Oper am Rhein
 Sae Eun Park (born 1989), ballet dancer, étoile, Paris Opera Ballet
 Hee Seo (born 1986), ballet dancer, principal dancer, American Ballet Theatre
 Ahn Yoo-jin (born 1968), belly dancer

Taiwan
 PeiJu Chien-Pott, dancer, Martha Graham Dance Company
 Fang-Yi Sheu, dancer, Martha Graham Dance Company

Australia
 Lucette Aldous (1938–2021), ballerina, teacher with the Australian Ballet
 Vicki Attard (born 1965), principal dancer, Australian Ballet
 Leanne Benjamin (born 1964), former ballet dancer, principal dancer, Royal Ballet
 Madeleine Eastoe, former ballet dancer, principal artist, Australian Ballet
 Roma Egan (born 1948), senior soloist, Australian Ballet
 Jean Garling (1907–1998), ballet dancer
 Amy Harris (born 1983), ballet dancer, principal artist, Australian Ballet
 Ella Havelka, ballet dancer, first indigenous dancer at Australian Ballet
 Margaret Illmann (born 1965), ballerina, National Ballet of Canada
 Lana Jones, former ballet dancer, Australian Ballet
 Marilyn Jones (born 1940), ballerina, director, Australian Ballet
 Dena Kaplan (born 1989), dancer, actress, film roles
 Stephanie Kurlow, ballet dancer
 Kirsty Martin (born 1976), principal dancer, Australian Ballet
 Laurel Martyn (1916–2013), ballerina, Australian Ballet, Vic-Wells Ballet
 Danielle Rowe (born 1982), ballet dancer and choreographer
 Amber Scott, ballet dancer, principal dancer, The Australian Ballet
 Margaret Scott (1922 (South Africa)–2019), ballerina, Ballet Rambert, Australian Ballet, director of the Australian Ballet School
 Dana Stephensen (born c. 1984), ballerina, Australian Ballet
 Meryl Tankard (born 1955), ballet dancer, choreographer, director Australian Dance Theatre
 Tamara Tchinarova (1919 (Romania)–2017), ballet dancer Ballets Russes, Borovansky Ballet
 Stephanie Williams, ballet dancer, American Ballet Theatre

New Zealand
 Rona Bailey (1914–2005), drama and dance practitioner, educationalist and activist
 Yvonne Cartier (c. 1930–2014), ballet dancer, choreographer, teacher of mime and movement, based in Paris
 Lusi Faiva, known for physically integrated dance
 Rowena Jackson (born 1926), prima ballerina, Sadler's Wells Ballet, Royal Ballet
 Hannah O'Neill (born 1993), ballet dancer, premier danseur, Paris Opera Ballet

Europe

Albania
 Megi Ndokaj (born 1993), Classical dancer, modern dancer, Albanian folk dancer, model

Austria
Kathrin Beck (born 1966), ice dancer, actress
Gertrud Bodenwieser (1890–1959), dancer, choreographer, teacher, pioneer of expressive dance
Trudl Dubsky (1913–1976), innovative dancer, choreographer, teacher
Poldi Dur (1917–1996), dancer, actress
Fanny Elssler (1810–1884), ballerina, Ballet du Théâtre de l'Académie Royale de Musique (now the Paris Opera), toured widely
Therese Elssler (1808–1878), ballerina, sister of Fanny Elssler
Angelika Führing (born 1976), ice dancer
Susi Handschmann (born 1959), ice dancer
Lilian Harmel (1908–1982), dancer, choreographer, teacher
Barbara Herzog (born 1985), ice dancer
Saskia Hölbling (born 1971), modern dancer, choreographer
Hilde Holger (1905–2001), expressionist dancer, choreographer, teacher
Katti Lanner (1829–1908), ballet dancer, choreographer, Viennese Ballet Company, Drury Lane
Maria Ley-Piscator (1898–1999), dancer, choreographer
Tilly Losch (1903–1975), ballet dancer, show dancer, choreographer, trained at the Vienna Opera, later turned to musicals including The Band Wagon
 Natascha Mair, ballet dancer, first soloist, Vienna State Ballet
Daria-Larissa Maritczak (born 1970s), ice dancer
Kathrin Menzinger (born 1988), competitive ballroom dancer
Albertina Rasch (1891–1967), ballerina, show dancer, choreographer, remembered for her extensive work in American musicals
Brigitte Scheijbal (fl. 1970s), ice dancer
Babsie Steger (born 1968), dancer, actress, television presenter
Eva Marie Veigel (1724–1822), early dancer in London
Cilli Wang (1909–2005), Austrian-born Dutch dancer, cabaret artist
Grete Wiesenthal (1891–1967), ballet dancer, worked with Max Reinhardt

Belgium
 Akarova (1904–1999), ballet dancer, choreographer, performed in various venues in Brussels
Jeanne Brabants (1920–2014), dancer, choreographer, teacher
 Veerle Casteleyn (born 1978), ballerina, show dancer, performing in Belgian musicals
Lydia Chagoll (1931–2020), dancer, choreographer, screenwriter, actress
 Bernice Coppieters (born 1970), ballet dancer, étoile and principal ballet master of the Ballets de Monte-Carlo
Anne Teresa De Keersmaeker (born 1960), contemporary dancer, choreographer
 Julie Alix de la Fay (c. 1746–1826), ballet dancer, teacher, helped develop the Royal Swedish Ballet
Joanna Leunis (born 1981), Latin ballroom dancer
 Annabelle Lopez Ochoa (born 1973), choreographer
 Andrée Marlière (1934–2008), ballet dancer, teacher, danced mainly in Belgian and German companies including the Flemish Opera
Adeline Plunkett (1824–1910), star of the Paris Opera Ballet
Ira Vannut (born 1994), ice dancer

Bulgaria
Ina Demireva (born 1989), ice dancer
Albena Denkova (born 1974), ice dancer
Maria Filippov (born 1973), ice dancer
Petya Gavazova (born 1968), ice dancer
 Mila Iskrenova (born 1960), modern dancer, choreographer

Croatia
Nikolina Nikoleski (born 1976), dancer and choreographer of Bharatanatyam

Czech Republic
Jana Andrsová (born 1939), ballet dancer, actress
Jitka Babická (born 1939), ice dancer
Radmila Chroboková (born 1976), ice dancer
Anka Čekanová (1905–1965), dancer, choreographer
Kamila Hájková (born 1987), ice dancer
Jindra Holá (born 1960), ice dancer
Dana Holanová (fl, 1960s), ice dancer
Gabriela Hrázská (born 1979), ice dancer
Diana Janošťáková (born 1984), ice dancer
 Jarmila Jeřábková (1912–1989), modern dancer, choreographer, taught Isadora Duncan's method
Lucie Kadlčáková (born 1982), ice dancer
 Daria Klimentová (born 1971), ballet dancer, former principal dancer, National Theatre Ballet, English National Ballet, teacher, Royal Ballet School
Kateřina Kovalová (born 1978), ice dancer
Jarmila Kröschlová (1893–1983), modern dancer, choreographer, teacher
Gabriela Kubová (born 1993), ice dancer
Leona Kvasnicová (born 1972), dancer, choreographer
 Nikola Márová (born 1980), prima ballerina, National Theatre (Prague)
Kateřina Mrázová (born 1972), ice dancer
Veronika Morávková (born 1983), ice dancer
Lucie Myslivečková (born 1989), ice dancer
Eva Peštová (born 1952), ice dancer
Anna Pisánská (fl. 1970s), ice dancer
Liliana Řeháková (1958–2008), ice dancer
Viera Řeháková (born 1964), ice dancer
Eva Romanová (born 1946), ice dancer
Barbora Silná (born 1989), Czech-Austrian ice dancer
Diana Skotnická (born 1940s), ice dancer
Ivana Střondalová (born 1970), ice dancer
Milena Tůmová (fl. 1960s), ice dancer
Nikola Višňová (born 1992), ice dancer
Šárka Vondrková (born 1976), ice dancer
Jana Zangiová (fl 1980s), ice dancer

Denmark
 Marie Barch 
 Dinna Bjørn (born 1947), prima ballerina, choreographer, ballet mistress, Royal Danish Ballet
 Mette Bødtcher (born 1965), balletna, trained and danced at the Royal Danish Theatre
 Gudrun Bojesen (born 1976), principal dancer, Royal Danish Ballet
 Edith von Bonsdorff (1890–1968), ballet dancer
 Valborg Borchsenius (1872–1949), soloist with the Royal Danish ballet, later an instructor
 Ida Brun (1792–1857), singer, dancer, mine artist
Camilla Dallerup (born 1974), ballroom dancer, coach
Eva Eklund (1922–2015), Swedish-born Danish dancer, singer, composer
 Vivi Flindt (born 1943), soloist with the Royal Danish Ballet, now a choreographer
Laurence Fournier Beaudry (born 1992), ice dancer
 Anine Frølich (1762–1784), ballerina, first native Dane in the Royal Danish Ballet
 Adeline Genée (1878–1970), ballerina, Royal Danish Ballet, later classical ballet and music hall roles at Empire, Leicester Square, in New York and Sydney
Katelyn Good (born 1990), ice dancer
Gerda Karstens (1903–1988), ballerina, Royal Danish Ballet
 Lucile Grahn (1819–1907), ballerina, Royal Danish Ballet, performed widely across Europe
 Susanne Grinder (born 1981), principal dancer, Royal Danish Ballet
 Eline Heger (1774–1842), ballet dancer, Royal Danish Ballet
 Else Højgaard (1906–1979), ballerina, stage and film actress, Royal Danish Theatre
Mette Ingvarsten (active since 2003), Danish dancer, choreographer and performance artist
Lis Jeppesen (born 1956), soloist with the Royal Danish Ballet
 Andrea Krætzmer (1811–1889), soloist in August Bournonville's early ballets
 Mette Hønningen (born 1944), principal at the Royal Danish Ballet
Charlotte Jørgensen (born 1972), ballroom dancer
Hélène Kirsova (1910–1962), ballerina, choreographer, director
 Margot Lander (1910–1961), born in Oslo, Denmark's first prima ballerina, Royal Danish Ballet
 Anna Lærkesen (born 1942), soloist at the Royal Danish Ballet
 Elna Lassen (1901–1930), ballerina, Royal Danish Ballet
 Gitte Lindstrøm (born 1975), principal dancer, teacher, Royal Danish Ballet
Charlotte Jørgensen (born 1987), dancer, singer, actress
Asta Mollerup (1881–1945), brought modern dance to Denmark
 Augusta Nielsen (1822–1902), ballerina, performed as a soloist in Bournonville's ballets
 Elna Ørnberg (1890–1969), ballerina, performed as a soloist in Bournonville's ballets
 Ulla Poulsen (1905–2001), soloist with the Royal Danish Ballet, also an actress
 Ida Praetorius (born 1993), ballet dancer, principal dancer, Royal Danish Ballet
 Ellen Price (1878–1968), prima ballerina, Royal Danish Ballet
 Juliette Price (1831–1906), prima ballerina, Royal Danish Ballet, worked closely with August Bournonville
 Kirsten Ralov (1922–1999), ballerina, ballet mistress, associate director, Royal Danish Ballet
 Louise Rasmussen (1815–1874), ballet dancer and stage actor, Royal Danish Ballet
Johanne Rosing (1756–1853), actress, ballet dancer
 Margrethe Schall (1775–1852), ballerina, Royal Danish Ballet
 Silja Schandorff (born 1969), ballerina, Royal Danish Ballet
Delia Sheppard (born 1961), actress, model, singer, ballet dancer
 Kirsten Simone (born 1934), first soloist Royal Danish Ballet
 Nini Theilade (born 1915), ballet dancer, choreographer, starred in the film A Midsummer Night's Dream
 Valda Valkyrien (1895–1956), Iceland-born prima ballerina, Royal Danish Ballet, later silent film actress in the United States
Mona Vangsaae (1920–1983), ballet dancer, choreographer and instructor
Emilie Walbom (1858–1932), ballet dancer, choreographer, ballet mistress

Estonia
Johanna Allik (born 1994), ice dancer
Grethe Grünberg (born 1988), ice dancer
Anna Mosenkova (born 1973), ice dancer
Agnes Oaks (born 1970), ballet dancer, former principal dancer, English National Ballet
Irina Shtork (born 1993), ice dancer
Marina Timofeieva (born 1984), ice dancer

Finland
Ritva Arvelo (1921–2013), actress, screenwriter, pioneer in modern dance
Sorella Englund (born 1945), soloist, character dancer, teacher, Royal Danish Ballet
Alina Frasa (1834–1899), Finnish ballet dancer and choreographer
Maggie Gripenberg, (1881–1976) pioneer of modern dance in Finland
Hanna Haarala (active since 2000s), Latin American dancer
Irja Hagfors (1905–1988), dancer, choreographer, dance teacher
Jessica Huot (born 1983), ice dancer
Olesia Karmi (born 1992), ice dancer
Hanna Karttunen (fl. 2000s), Latin American dancer
Oona Kivelä (born 1983), professional dancer, pole dancer
Jaana Kunitz (born 1972), ballroom dancer, dance instructor
Monica Lindfors (born 2000), ice dancer
Henna Lindholm (born 1989), ice dancer
Marja Merisalo (born 1965), choreographer, dancer, director
Cleo Nordi (1898–1983), prima ballerina with Anna Pavlova, choreographer and teacher in London
Susanna Rahkamo (born 1965), ice dancer
Sirpa Suutari (fl. 1990s), professional ballroom dancer
Cecilia Törn (born 1994), ice dancer
Satu Tuomisto, active since 2000, contemporary dance choreographer
Anu Viheriäranta (born 1982), principal dancer, Dutch National Ballet
Maikki Uotila (born 1977), ice dancer

France
 Angélique Abachkina (born 2000), ice dancer
 Françoise Adret (1920–2018), ballet dancer, teacher, choreographer, director
 Émilienne d’Alençon (1869–1946), dancer, actress, courtesan
 Marie Allard (1738–1802), ballerina, Comédie-Française, Paris Opera Ballet
 Mademoiselle Ambroisine (1811–1882), prima ballerina, leading lady of romantic ballet in Brussels
 Madame Anatole (1793–?), prima ballerina, Paris Opera Ballet
 Anne and Janneton Auretti (fl 1740–1760)
 Jane Avril (1868–1943), can-can dancer, Moulin Rouge
 Josephine Baker (1906–1975), American-born erotic dancer, singer, entertainer, Folies Bergère, also in films
 Léonore Baulac (born 1989), ballet dancer, étoile of the Paris Opera Ballet
 Claude Bessy (born 1932), ballerina, teacher, Paris Opera Ballet
 Émilie Bigottini (1784–1858), ballerina, Paris Opera Ballet
 Zoé Blanc (born 1988), ice dancer
 Doriane Bontemps (born 1967), ice dancer
 Emmanuelle Bouaziz (active since 2007), actress, dancer, singer
 Hélène Bouchet (born 1980), ballet dancer, principal dancer, Hamburg Ballet
 Muriel Boucher-Zazoui (fl 1970s), ice dancer
 Olympe Bradna (1920–2012), dancer, actress
 Élodie Brouiller (born 1987), ice dancer
 Roxane Butterfly (active since 1998), tap dancer, choreographer
 Rita Cadillac (1936–1995), exotic dancer, singer, actress, Crazy Horse, Folies Bergère
 Vanessa Cailhol (active since 2004), dancer, singer, musicals performer
 Leslie Caron (born 1931), ballerina, film actress, starred in Gigi
 Pernelle Carron (born 1986), ice dancer
 Céline Céleste (1815–1882), ballerina, highly successful in New York
 Marie-Adrienne Chameroy (1779–1802), dancer at the Paris Opera
 Jeanne Chasles (1869–1939), dancer, choreographer and professor of dance at the National Conservatory
 Cha-U-Kao, dancer and clown
 Jeanne Chasles (1869–1939), dancer, choreographer at the Opéra Comique
 Yvette Chauviré (1917–2016), prima ballerina, director, Paris Opera Ballet
 Isabelle Ciaravola (born 1972), ballet dancer, étoile of the Paris Opera Ballet
 Valentine Colasante (born 1989), ballet dancer, étoile of the Paris Opera Ballet
 Émilie Cozette (born 1981), ballerina, étoile of the Paris Opera Ballet
 Polly Cuninghame (1785–1837), ballerina, active in Amsterdam, Stadsschouwburg
 Marie Anne de Cupis de Camargo (1710–1770), prima ballerina, Paris Opera Ballet, the first to execute the entrechat quatre and to wear ballet slippers
 Sophie Daguin (1801–1881), ballerina, choreographer, Royal Swedish Opera
 Suzette Defoye (1741–1787), ballet dancer, actress, opera singer
 Isabelle Delobel (born 1978), ice dancer
 Véronique Delobel (born 1978), ice dancer
 Davina Delor (born 1952), dancer, choreographer, Buddhist nun
 Bintou Dembélé (born 1975), pioneering hip hop dancer, choreographer
 Dominique Deniaud (born 1977), ice dancer
 Gaby Deslys (1881–1920), show dancer, singer, actress, performed on Broadway's Winter Garden Theatre
 Suzanne Douvillier (1778–1826), ballerina, choreographer, perhaps the first trained ballerina to perform in the United States
 Adèle Dumilâtre (1821–1909), prima ballerina, Paris Opera Ballet, Drury Lane, La Scala
 Aurélie Dupont (born 1973), director and former ballet dancer, étoile and artistic director, Paris Opera Ballet
 Pauline Duvernay (1812–1894), ballerina, Paris Opera Ballet, also London
 Estelle Elizabeth (born 1996), ice dancer
 Eugénie Fiocre (1845–1908), ballerina, Paris Opera Ballet, often in male roles
 Louise Fitzjames (born 1809), ballet dancer with the Paris Opera
 Mathilde Froustey (born 1985), ballet dancer, principal dancer, San Francisco Ballet
 Dorothée Gilbert (born 1983), ballerina, étoile of Paris Opera Ballet
 Marie-Agnès Gillot (born c. 1974), ballet dancer, choreographer, étoile of Paris Opera Ballet
 Geneviève Gosselin (1791–1818), ballerina, Paris Opera Ballet
 La Goulue (1866–1929), can-can dancer, Moulin Rouge
 Isabelle Guérin (born 1961), ballet dancer, principal dancer with Paris Opera Ballet
 Christiane Guhel (born 1962), ice dancer
 Sylvie Guillem (born 1965), ballerina, choreographer, contemporary dancer, Paris Opera Ballet, Sadler's Wells Theatre
 Marie-Madeleine Guimard (1743–1816), ballerina, star of the Paris Opera under Louis XVI
 Nathalie Hervé (born 1963), ice dancer
 Fauve Hautot (born 1986), dancer, choreographer
 Zizi Jeanmaire (1924–2020), ballet dancer, film actress, appeared in Hans Christian Andersen
 Katherine Kath (1920–2012), prima ballerina, Théâtre du Châtelet, film and television actress
 Dominique Khalfouni (born 1951), ballerina, teacher, Paris Opera Ballet, Ballet National de Marseille
 De Lafontaine (1655–1738), ballerina, considered to be the first professional female dancer, Paris Opera
 Brigitte Lefèvre (born 1944), dancer, choreographer, director of the Paris Opera Ballet
 Marcelle Lender (1862–1926), stage dancer, singer, Théâtre des Variétés, painted by Toulouse-Lautrec
 Marie Lesueur (1799–1890), ballet dancer, Théâtre de Marseille, Théâtre de la Monnaie
 Agnès Letestu (born 1971), ballerina, étoile of Paris Opera Ballet
 Emma Livry (1842–1863), ballerina, romantic ballet, Paris Opera, died after her clothes caught fire on stage
 Sophie Lothaire (1732–?), dancer, actress, director, active in Brussels
 Monique Loudières (born 1956), ballet dancer, teacher, étoile with the Paris Opera Ballet
 Mariquita (1830–1922), see Algeria
 Brigitte Martin (fl 1960s), ice dancer
 Sophie Martin (born 1984), ballet dancer, principal dancer, Scottish Ballet
 Genia Melikova (1924–2004), ballerina, choreographer, teacher, Ballet Russe de Monte Carlo,  Grand Ballet du Marquis de Cuevas, also performed on Broadway
 Cléo de Mérode (1875–1966), dancer, international star
 Antonine Meunier (1877–1972), ballet dancer, teacher, writer
 Magali Messac (fl 1969), ballet dancer, joined the American Ballet Theatre in 1969
 Sophie Moniotte (born 1969), ice dancer
 Madame Montessu (1803–1877), prima ballerina, Paris Opera Ballet
 Marion Motin (active since 2006), dancer, choreographer
 Marguerite Morel (1737–1804), ballerina, opera singer, active in Sweden at Bollhuset
 Bérangère Nau (born 1976), ice dancer
 Stacia Napierkowska (1891–1945), dancer, film actress, appeared in many silent films
 Lise Noblet (1801–1852), ballerina, Paris Opera Ballet
 Clairemarie Osta (born 1970), former ballet dancer, étoile with the Paris Opera Ballet
 Martine Olivier (fl 1970s), ice dancer
 Alia Ouabdelsselam (born 1978), ice dancer
 Myriam Ould-Braham (born 1982), ballerina, étoile of the Paris Opera Ballet
 Ludmila Pagliero (born 1983), see Argentina
 Corinne Paliard (born 1970), ice dancer
 Gabriella Papadakis (born 1995), ice dancer
 Mademoiselle Parisot (c. 1775–after 1837), opera singer, ballet dancer, King's Theatre
 Nathalie Péchalat (born 1983), ice dancer
 Roxane Petetin (born 1981), ice dancer
 Sonia Petrovna (born 1952), ballerina, actress
 Marie-Claude Pietragalla (born 1963), dancer, choreographer
 Wilfride Piollet (1943–2015), ballerina, choreographer
 Barbara Piton (born 1977), ice dancer
 Élisabeth Platel (born 1959), prima ballerina, Paris Opera Ballet
 Françoise Prévost (c. 1680–1741), ballerina, remembered for her solo Les Caractères de la Danse, Paris Opera
 Liane de Pougy (1869–1950), courtesan, cabaret dancer, Folies Bergère
 Laetitia Pujol (born 1975), ballet dancer, étoile with the Paris Opera Ballet
 Alice Renavand (born 1980), ballet dancer, étoile with the Paris Opera Ballet
 Rigolboche (1842–1920), stage dancer, possibly invented the can-can
 Sarah-Marine Rouffanche (born 1997), ice dancer
 Marie Sallé (1707–1756), prima ballerina, first female choreographer, Paris Opera Ballet, Lincoln's Inn Fields Theatre, London
 Marie Sanlaville (1847–1930), prima ballerina, Paris Opera Ballet, often in male roles
 Magali Sauri (born 1977), ice dancer
 Élisabeth Soligny (1749–?), prima ballerina, ballet mistress, Royal Swedish Ballet
 Louise Stichel (1856–after 1933), dancer, ballet master
 Agnès Souret (1902–1928), show dancer, actress, winner of first Miss France contest
 Marie-Thérèse de Subligny (1666–1735), prima ballerina, Paris Opera Ballet, first professional ballet dancer to appear in England (1702)
 Marina Svetlova (1922–2009), ballerina, Original Ballet Russe, Metropolitan Opera Ballet
 Ludmilla Tchérina (1924–2004), prima ballerina, Ballet des Champs-Élysées, also appeared in films and on television
 Ghislaine Thesmar (born 1943), prima ballerina, choreographer, Ballets de Monte-Carlo
 Caroline Truong (born 1980), ice dancer
 Marie van Goethem (born 1865, death unknown), dancer, model
 Violette Verdy (1933–2016), ballerina, Ballet des Champs-Élysées, New York City Ballet, director of Paris Opera Ballet
 Adorée Villany (1891–19??), dancer, choreographer
 Dominique Yvon (born 1968), ice dancer

Germany
 Ruth Abramovitsch Sorel (1907–1974), dancer, choreographer, director, active in Canada
 Karin von Aroldingen (1941–2018), ballet dancer, former principal dancer with New York City Ballet
Annerose Baier (born 1946), ice dancer
 Pina Bausch (1940–2009), dancer and choreographer, company founder, Tanztheater
Antonia Becherer (born 1963), ice dancer
Christina Beier (born 1984), ice dancer
Lotte Berk (1913–2003), ballet dancer, teacher
 Anita Berber (1899–1928), cabaret dancer in Berlin
 Hannelore Bey (born 1941), ballerina, Komische Oper Berlin
Maria Bińczyk (born 1983), German-born Polish ice dancer
Petra Born (born 1965), ice dancer
Sonja Bragowa (1903–1998), expressionist dancer, revue dancer
Angelika Buck (born 1950), ice dancer
 Ursula Cain (1927–2011), modern dancer, ballet dancer, teacher, Leipzig Opera, television appearances
 Marlene Charell (born 1944), modern dancer, Le Lido
 Ursula Deinert (1910–1988), dancer, film actress
 Clotilde von Derp (1892–1974), expressionist dancer, partner and wife of Alexander Sakharoff
 Jutta Deutschland (born 1958), prima ballerina, Komische Oper Berlin
 Hertha Feist (1896–1990), expressionist dancer, combining gymnastics, nudity and dance
Stefanie Frohberg (born 1991), ice dancer
 Yvonne Georgi (1903–1975), ballerina, choreographer, ballet mistress
 Valeska Gert (1892–1978), cabaret dancer, film actress, also in the United States
 Tatjana Gsovsky (1901–1993), see Russia
Grit Hegesa (1891–1972), dancer, silent film actress
 Anna Heinel (1753–1808), ballerina, Paris Opera
 Heike Hennig (born 1966), modern dancer, choreographer, teacher, active mainly in Leipzig
Ida Herion (1896–1959), modernist dance teacher in Stuttgart
Carolina Hermann (born 1988), ice dancer
 Reinhild Hoffmann (born 1966), show dancer
 Hanya Holm (1893–1992), major contributor to modern dance in the United States, especially Broadway musicals
 Dore Hoyer (1911–1967), expressionist dancer, choreographer, teacher, associate of Mary Wigman
 La Jana (1905–1940), Austrian-born cabaret dancer, film actress
 Karina Jäger-von Stülpnagel, ballet dancer, former soloist with Royal Ballet of Flanders
 Birgit Keil (born 1944), prima ballerina, teacher, Stuttgart Ballet
 Tiger Kirchharz (born 1985), show dancer, choreographer and actress, also in the United States
Franziska Romana Koch (1748–1796), ballet dancer, soprano singer, actress
Shari Koch (born 1993), ice dancer
Tanja Kolbe (born 1990), ice dancer
 Gertrud Leistikow (1885–1948), show dancer, teacher in Amsterdam
 Rosemarie Lindt (born 1939), ballet dancer, film actress
 Maria Litto (1919–1996), prima ballerina, choreographer, film actress, pioneered dance on German television
Kavita Lorenz (born 1995), ice dancer
 Jo Mihaly (1902–1989), expressionist dancer, writer, fled to Zurich
Katharina Müller (born 1995), ice dancer
 Nicole Nau (born 1963), Argentine tango dancer, show director
 Lea Niako (1908–?), exotic dancer, film actress
 Anneliese von Oettingen (1917–2002), ballerina, choreographer, teacher, taught ballet and modern dance in Cincinnati
Edith Oß (1914–2012), dancer, film actress
 Gret Palucca (1902–1993), dancer, teacher in Berlin and post-war East Germany
Eva Prawitz (born 1920), ice dancer
 Laya Raki (born 1927), dancer, film actress
Stephanie Rauer (born 1979), ice dancer
 Edel von Rothe (1925–2008), prima ballerina, ballet mistress, Deutsche Oper am Rhein
 Sonia Santiago (born 1966), ballet dancer and teacher
 Steffi Scherzer (born 1957), prima ballerina, Berlin State Opera, instructor in Zurich
Ria Schiffner (born 1996), ice dancer
 Bessie Schonberg (1906–1997), modern dancer, choreographer, teacher, active mainly in New York
Yvonne Schulz (born 1974), ice dancer
Miriam Steinel (born 1982), ice dancer
Rina Thieleke (born 1987), ice dancer
 Natascha Trofimowa (1923–1979), prima ballerina, German State Opera, Bavarian State Opera
Georgette Tsinguirides (born 1928), ballet dancer, ballet mistress, choreologist
 Konstanze Vernon (1939–2013), prima ballerina, teacher, Bavarian State Opera
 Carmen Vincelj (born 1972), ballroom dancer
Jill Vernekohl (born 1980), ice dancer
 Sasha Waltz (born 1963), modern dancer, choreographer, director, active in Berlin
 Sybil Werden (1924–2007), dancer, film actress
 Mary Wigman (1886–1973), expressionist dancer, choreographer, teacher, important figure in modern dance, taught in Dresden and post-war Berlin
Marianne Winkelstern (1910–1966), dancer, film actress
Kati Winkler (born 1974), ice dancer
Greta Wrage von Pustau (1902–1989), dancer, dance teacher

Greece
 Toula Limnaios (born 1963), dancer, choreographer, based in Germany
 Tatiana Mamaki (1921–2007), ballerina, choreographer, teacher, ballet of the Greek National Opera
 Evelina Papoulia (born 1971), modern dancer, actress
 Dora Stratou (1903–1988), Greek folk dancer

Hungary
Krisztina Barta (born 1991), ice dancer
Ilona Berecz (born 1975), ice dancer
Ilona Berecz (born 1947), ice dancer, coach
 Valéria Dienes (1879–1978), dancer, choreographer, and movement theorist
 Steffi Duna (1910–1992), dancer, film actress in the United States
Klára Engi (born 1967), ice dancer
Zita Gebora (born 1982), ice dancer
Nóra Hoffmann (born 1985), ice dancer
Györgyi Korda (born 1964), ice dancer
 Nora Kovach (1931–2009), ballerina, Budapest State Opera, Festival Ballet, London
Edit Mató (born 1966), ice dancer
Zsuzsanna Nagy (born 1986), ice dancer
Judit Péterfy (born 1960s), ice dancer
Kornélia Pongo (born 1976), ice dancer
Krisztina Regőczy (born 1955), ice dancer
Gabriella Remport (active 1978–1984), ice dancer
Enikő Somorjai (born 1981), ballet dancer
Bianca Szíjgyártó (born 1981), ice dancer
Dóra Turóczi (born 1990), ice dancer

Iceland
Hanna Rún Óladóttir (born 1990), ballroom dancer
Þórhildur Þorleifsdóttir (born 1945), actress, dancer, choreographer, cultural director

Ireland
 Jean Butler (born 1971), Irish step dancer
 Marguerite Donlon (born 1966), ballerina, choreographer, director, working mainly in Germany
Joanne Doyle (born 1973), dancer, Riverdance specialist
 Bernadette Flynn (born 1979), Irish dancer, show dancer, performed in musical Lord of the Dance
 Margaret Kelly Leibovici (1910–2004), show dancer in Paris
 Monica Loughman (born c. 1978), ballerina, joined the Russian Perm Opera and Ballet Theatre in 1992, founder and director of Ireland's Monica Loughman Ballet
 Lola Montez (1821–1861), dancer, courtesan
 Joan Denise Moriarty (c. 1912–1992), ballerina, choreographer, traditional Irish dancer, founder of professional ballet in Ireland
 Gillian Norris (born 1978), show dancer
 Ninette de Valois (1898–2001), ballerina, choreographer, director, founded Vic-Wells Ballet which became the Royal Ballet

Italy
 Eleonora Abbagnato (born 1978), ballet dancer, étoile at the Paris Opera Ballet
Lorenza Alessandrini (born 1990), ice dancer
Silvia Azzoni (born 1973), ballet dancer, principal dancer, Hamburg Ballet
Alessia Aureli (born 1984), ice dancer
Giovanna Baccelli (1753–1801), ballerina, moved to London
 Teresa Bandettini (1763–1837), dancer, poet
Giovanna Bassi (1762–1834), ballerina based in Sweden
Alice Bellagamba (born 1987), dancer, actress
Brunilde Bianchi (born 1964), ice dancer
 Giuseppina Bozzacchi (1853–1870), ballerina, Paris Opera
 Sabrina Brazzo (born 1968), prima ballerina, La Scala Ballet
 Carlotta Brianza (1867–1930), prima ballerina, La Scala, Mariinsky Theatre
Amalia Brugnoli (1802–1892), ballerina, first to have used the pointe technique 
Alessia Busi (born 1994), ice dancer
Stefania Calegari (born 1967), ice dancer
 Barbara Campanini (1721–1799), ballerina, actress, Paris Opera
Anna Cappellini (born 1987), ice dancer
 Fanny Cerrito (1817–1909), ballerina, early female choreographer, Paris Opera, La Scala
Matilde Ciccia (born 1952), ice dancer
 Petra Conti (born 1988), ballet dancer, principal dancer with Los Angeles Ballet
Lucia Cormani (c.1854–c.1934), ballet dancer, choreographer, teacher
Antonietta Dell'Era (1861–1945), prima ballerina, active in St Petersberg and Berlin
Oriella Dorella (born 1952), étoile with La Scala Theatre Ballet
 Viviana Durante (born 1967), prima ballerina, Royal Ballet, La Scala
Federica Faiella (born 1981), ice dancer
 Amalia Ferraris (1828–1904), ballerina,  Theatre Royal, Paris Opera
 Alessandra Ferri (born 1963), Prima ballerina assoluta, active with the Royal Ballet, American Ballet Theatre and La Scala Theatre Ballet
 Carla Fracci (1936–2021), prima ballerina, choreographer, ballat mistress, La Scala, Teatro dell'Opera di Roma
Sofia Fuoco (1830–1916), ballet dancer, performed in Paris and London
Barbara Fusar-Poli (born 1972), ice dancer
Mara Galeazzi (born 1973), ballet dancer, former principal dancer, The Royal Ballet
 Rosina Galli (1892–1940), prima ballerina at La Scala Theatre Ballet, Chicago Ballet, as well as the première danseuse of the Metropolitan Opera House
 Gilda Gelati (born 1967), prima ballerina, La Scala Theatre Ballet
Diane Gerencser (born 1972), ice dancer
Sara Ghislandi (born 1998), ice dancer
 Carlotta Grisi (1819–1899), prima ballerina, famous for her Giselle, Paris Opera, Imperial Ballet
Tiziana Lauri (born 1959), ballet dancer with the Rome Opera Ballet
 Pierina Legnani (1863–1930), prima ballerina with La Scala, later with Russia's Imperial Ballet
Daniela Malusardi (born 1956), choreographer, teacher, dancer
 Nicoletta Manni (born 1991), prima ballerina, La Scala Theatre Ballet
 Liliana Merlo (1925–2002), pioneer of classical ballet in Abruzzo
Giuseppina Morlacchi (1946–1886), Italian-American dancer, introduced the can-can to the American stage
Carolina Moscheni (born 1996), ice dancer
Flavia Ottaviani (born 1981), ice dancer
Isabella Pajardi (born 1989), ice dancer
Marta Paoletti (born 1981), ice dancer
Giuliana Penzi (1918–2008), ballet dancer, choreographer, teacher, co-founder of the Rome Academy
Maria Perini (1873–1939), ballet teacher in Tbilisi
Camilla Pistorello (born 1987), ice dancer
 Attilia Radice (1914–1980), prima ballerina, teacher, La Scala, Rome Opera
Sara Renda (born 1991), ballet dancer, étoile at the Opéra National de Bordeaux
 Carolina Rosati (1826–1905), prima ballerina, Paris Opera Ballet, Imperial Ballet in St Petersburg
 Rita Sangalli (1849–1909), prima ballerina, Paris Opera Ballet
Luciana Savignano (born 1943), prima ballerina
Delia Scala (1929–2004), ballerina, actress
Sofia Sforza (born 1995), ice dancer
Camilla Spelta (born 1988), ice dancer
 Marie Taglioni (1804–1884), see Sweden
Federica Testa (born 1983), ice dancer
Lia Trovati (born 1965), ice dancer
Odette Valery (1883–?), dancer, noted for dancing with snakes
Ambra Vallo (fl 1990s), principal with the Birmingham Royal Ballet
 Carlotta Zambelli (1875–1968), prima ballerina, teacher, Paris Opera
Virginia Zucchi (1849–1933), ballerina, teacher, danced in Russia

Latvia
Tatjana Barbakoff (1899–1944), ballet dancer, Chinese style dancer
 Ludmilla Chiriaeff (1924–1996), Latvian-Canadian dancer, choreographer, teacher, and company director
 Elza Leimane (born 1984), ballet dancer whose father, Aivars Leimanis, is artistic director of Latvia's National Ballet
 Simona Orinska (born 1978), butoh artist, choreographer, dance movement therapy

Lithuania
 Svetlana Beriosova (1932–1998), prima ballerina, Royal Ballet
 Sonia Gaskell (1904–1974), dancer, choreographer, teacher, artistic director of the Dutch National Ballet
 Jurgita Dronina (born 1986), ballet dancer, principal dancer, National Ballet of Canada, formerly  English National Ballet, Dutch National Ballet, Royal Swedish Ballet
  (born 1962), ballet dancer and pedagogue
  (1926–2010), dancer and choreographer
  (born 1920), sculptor, painter and dancer
  (born 1965), dancer, choreographer and teacher
 Eglė Špokaitė (born 1971), ballet dancer, prima ballerina of the Lithuanian National Opera and ballet theater (1989–2011)

Luxembourg
 Germaine Damar (born 1929), stage dancer, film actress

Netherlands
 Maria Francisca Bia (1809–1889), ballerina, opera singer
 Marie Bovet (born 1948), prima ballerina, Dutch National Ballet, 1968 (under Director Sonia Gaskell); expert leaper
Anna Maria de Bruyn (1708–1744), stage actress, ballet dancer
 Polly Cuninghame (1785–1837), see France
Anouk van Dijk (born 1965), dancer, choreographer, artistic director
 Sonia Gaskell (1904–1974), see Lithuania
Chaja Goldstein (1908–1999), Jewish dancer and singer
Martine van Hamel (born 1945), ballerina, director, teacher
 Mata Hari (1876–1917), exotic modern dancer in Paris, executed for spying
Corrie Hartong (1906–1991), dancer, dance teacher, choreographer
Penney de Jager (born 1948), ballet dancer, choreographer, founded the Holland Show Ballet
Bettie de Jong (born 1933), ballet dancer, lead dancer with the Paul Taylor Dance Company
 Igone de Jongh (born 1979), former ballet dancer, principal dancer, Dutch National Ballet
 Susanna van Lee (c. 1630–1700), actress, ballet dancer, also performed in Sweden
 Alexandra Radius (born 1942), ballerina, Dutch National Ballet, American Ballet Theatre
Natalie La Rose (born 1988), singer, dancer, active in the United States
Didy Veldman (born 1967), ballet dancer, choreographer

Norway
 Kjersti Alveberg (born 1948), ballet dancer, show dancer, choreographer, director
Mona Berntsen (born 1990), Norwegian-Moroccan dancer
Anne Borg (1936–2016), ballet dancer, choreographer
Belinda Braza (born 1981), singer, professional dancer, dance teacher
 Gyda Christensen (1872–1964), actress, dancer, choreographer, headed the National Theatre's ballet school
Anne Borg (1912–2003), dancer, ballet teacher
Greta Gynt (1916–2000), singer, dancer, actress
 Henriette Hansen (1814–1892), actress, opera singer, considered to be Norway's first native professional ballet dancer
Signe Hofgaard (1901–1998), dancer, choreographer, organizational leader
 Lillebil Ibsen (1899–1989), ballet dancer, film actress, danced in Max Reinhardt's pantomime productions
Inga Jacobi (1891–1937), German-born Norwegian ballet dancer, choreographer
Jorunn Kirkenær (1926–2021), ballet dancer, choreographer
 Ellen Kjellberg (born 1948), ballet dancer, Norwegian National Opera and Ballet
Gerd Kjølaas (1909–2000), ballet dancer, choreographer
Gerd Larsen (1921–2001), ballerina, performed with England's Royal Ballet
 Indra Lorentzen (born 1956), ballet dancer, choreographer
 Ingrid Lorentzen (born 1972), ballerina, director, Norwegian National Ballet
 Henny Mürer (1925–1997), ballet dancer, choreographer, Norwegian National Opera and Ballet, headed National Ballet School
Tone Nyhagen (1963–2015), world champion sport dancer
 Edith Roger (1922–2023), ballet dancer, modern dancer, choreographer, theatre director, Ny Norsk Ballett
Alice Mürer Siem (1925–2002), ballet dancer, choreographer, danced in revues, operettas and classical ballet 
 Klara Semb (1884–1970), Norwegian folk dancer, choreographer, teacher
Elizabeth Svarstad (born 1977), baroque dancer, choreographer, dance historian
Madame Stuart (fl 1772), possibly the first Norwegian ballerina, also acrobat, singer, actress, composer
 Marguerite Thoresen (1908–1967), international ballet dancer performing as Rita Tori
Vera Zorina (1917–2003), ballerina, actress, choreographer
Silje Aker Johnsen (active since 2013), singer, dancer

Poland
Agata Błażowska (born 1978), ice dancer
Joanna Budner (born 1988), ice dancer
Agnieszka Domańska (born 1975), ice dancer
Agnieszka Dulej (born 1983), ice dancer
Iwona Filipowicz (born 1976), ice dancer
Halina Gordon-Półtorak (fl 1970s), ice dancer, referee, chair of the International Skating Union's technical committee for ice dancing
Honorata Górna (born 1968), ice dancer, national champion 
Małgorzata Grajcar (fl 1988), ice dancer, national champion
 Gilda Gray (1901–1959), show dancer, known for the shimmy
 Loda Halama (1911–1996), prima ballerina, Grand Theatre, Warsaw, several Polish films
 Edyta Herbuś (born 1981), competition dancer
Natalia Kaliszek (born 1996), ice dancer
Alexandra Kauc (born 1980), ice dancer
 Marianna Malińska (1767–fl.1797), ballerina, the first native ballerina in Poland. 
Sylwia Nowak (born 1976), ice dancer, coach
Justyna Plutowska (born 1991), ice dancer
Dominika Polakowska (born 1982), ice dancer
Kamila Przyk (fl 1997), ice dancer
 Marie Rambert (1888–1982), ballerina, teacher, Ballet Rambert
Agata Rosłońska (born 1983), ice dancer
 Edyta Śliwińska (born 1981), ballroom dancer
 Natasza Urbańska (born 1977), actress, singer, ballroom dancer
Jolanta Wesołowska (born 1958), ice dancer
Teresa Weyna (born 1950), ice dancer

Portugal
 Vera Mantero (born 1966), dancer and choreographer

Romania
Alina Cojocaru (born 1981), ballet dancer, principal dancer, English National Ballet, formerly The Royal Ballet
Mijaela Tesleoanu (1942–2011), ballerina and ballet mistress
Francesca Velicu,

Russia

Elena Andreianova (1819–1857), prima ballerina, Bolshoi Ballet
Marina Anissina (born 1975), French-Russian ice dancer
Natalia Annenko (born 1964), ice dancer
Marina Antipova (born 1992), ice dancer
Ksenia Antonova (born 1990), ice dancer
Altynai Asylmuratova (born 1961), prima ballerina, Mariinsky Ballet, worldwide guest appearances, director of Vaganova Academy
Elena Batanova (born 1964), ice dancer
Anastasia Belova (born 1981), ice dancer
Natalia Bestemianova (born 1960), ice dancer
Ekaterina Bobrova (born 1990), ice dancer
Catherine Chislova (1846–1889), ballerina
Liana Churilova (born 1991), ballroom dancer
Alexandra Danilova (1903–1997), ballerina, teacher, Ballets Russes, emigrated to the United States
Maria Danilova (1793–1810), ballet dancer from the St. Petersburg school, died when 17
Ekaterina Davydova (born 1978), ice dancer
Anna Demidova (born 1988), Russian-American ballroom dancer
Katusha Demidova (fl 2009), professional World Ballroom Dance champion
Oksana Domnina (born 1984), ice dancer
Natalia Dubova (born 1948), ice dancer, coach
Sofia Evdokimova (born 1996), ice dancer
Sofia Fedorova (1879–1963), ballerina
Elena Garanina (born 1956), ice dancer
Tamara Geva (1907–1997), Russian-American actress, ballet dancer, choreographer
 Sofia Golovkina (1915–2004), ballerina, teacher, head of Bolshoi Ballet School
Julia Golovina (born 1982), ice dancer
Anastasia Gorshkova (born 1987), ice dancer
Kristina Gorshkova (born 1989), ice dancer
 Nadezhda Gracheva (born 1969), see Kazakhstan
Anastasia Grebenkina (born 1979), ice dancer
Elena Grinenko (born 1976), ballroom dancer, now in the United States
Irina Grishkova (born 1946), ice dancer
Oksana Grishuk (born 1972), ice dancer
Tatjana Gsovsky (1901–1993), German-Russian ballet dancer and choreographer
Ekaterina Gvozdkova (born 1981), ice dancer, coach
Elena Ilinykh (born 1994), ice dancer
Avdotia Istomina (1799–1848), most celebrated 19th-century Imperial Russian ballerina
Anna Johansson (1860–1917), ballerina with the St. Petersburg Imperial Ballet
Katya Jones (born 1993), dancer and choreographer, now in the United Kingdom
Vera Karalli (1889–1972), ballerina, Bolshoi Theatre, also film actress, ballet mistress Romanian Opera
Tamara Karsavina (1885–1978), prima ballerina, teacher, Imperial Russian Ballet, Royal Ballet
Maria Kochetkova (born 1984), freelance ballet dancer, principal dancer, formerly San Francisco Ballet and American Ballet Theatre
Olga Khokhlova (1891–1955), ballet dancer, first wife of Pablo Picasso
Mathilde Kschessinska (1872–1971), ballerina of Polish extraction, danced with Saint Petersburg's Mariinsky Ballet, later teacher in France
Maria Nikolaevna Kuznetsova (1880–1966), prominent opera singer and dancer
Ileana Leonidoff (1893–after 1966) founder of the ballet corp of the Royal Opera of Rome, Ballet Oficial de Bolivia, Guayaquil Ballet (Ecuador) and Trujillo Ballet Company (Peru).
 Lydia Lopokova (1892–1981), prima ballerina, Ballets Russes
 Svetlana Lunkina (born 1979), ballet dancer, principal dancer, National Ballet of Canada
 Yulia Makhalina (born 1968), principal dancer, Mariinsky Ballet
 Natalia Makarova (born 1940), prima ballerina, choreographer, Kirov Ballet
 Sulamith Messerer (1908–2004), ballerina,  choreographer, ballet mistress, Bolshoi Theatre, helped establish Tokyo Ballet
 Bronislava Nijinska (1891–1972), prima ballerina, choreographer, teacher, Imperial Ballet, Ballets Russes
 Cleo Nordi (1898–1983), prima ballerina with Pavlova's troupe, choreographer, teacher in London
 Natalia Osipova (born 1986), ballet dancer, principal dancer, Royal Ballet, formerly Bolshoi Ballet and Mikhailovsky ballet
 Veronika Part (born 1978), former ballet dancer, principal dancer, American Ballet Theatre
 Daria Pavlenko (born 1978), prima ballerina, Mariinsky Ballet
 Anna Pavlova (1881–1931), prima ballerina, danced with the Imperial Russian Ballet and the Ballets Russes
 Maya Plisetskaya (1925–2015), prima ballerina, choreographer, teacher, danced with the Bolshoi
Julia Powers (fl. 1991), Russian-American ballroom dancer 
Olga Preobrajenska (1871–1962), ballerina of the Russian Imperial Ballet
Kristina Rihanoff (born 1977), professional ballroom dancer
Jia Ruskaja (1902–1970), Russian dancer and choreographer who established a national dance school in Italy
Polina Semionova (born 1985) ballet dancer, principal dancer, Berlin State Ballet and American Ballet Theatre
Marina Semyonova (1908–2010), prima ballerina, teacher, danced with the Bolshoi
Tatyana Shlykova (1773–1863), ballerina and opera singer
Elena Smirnova (1888–1934), last prima ballerina with the Mariinsky Theatre in Imperial Russia 
Olga Smirnova (born 1991), recent leading roles with the Bolshoi
Alina Somova (born 1985), prima ballerina, Mariinsky Ballet
Raisa Struchkova (1925–2005), ballet dancer, teacher
Elena Surgutskaya (born 1986), ballroom dancer, choreographer
Thamara de Swirsky (1888–1961), dancer, known for dancing barefoot
Viktoria Tereshkina (born 1983), prima ballerina, Mariinsky Ballet
Avdotya Timofeyeva (born 1739, death unknown), early ballerina trained by Jean-Baptiste Landé
Anna Tsygankova (born 1979), ballet dancer, principal dancer, Dutch National Ballet
Galina Ulanova (1910–1998), prima ballerina, danced with the Mariinsky Ballet and the Bolshoi 
Agrippina Vaganova (1879–1951), ballerina, ballet teacher, developed the Vaganova method
Ekaterina Vaganova (born 1988), champion ballroom and Latin American dancer
Stella Voskovetskaya (born 1965), ballerina, teacher, emigrated to the US
Lyubov Yegorova (1880–1972), ballerina, ballet teacher
Yulia Zagoruychenko (born 1981), Latin American dance champion

Serbia
 Irma de Malkhozouny, ballet dancer

Slovenia
 Stanislava Brezovar (1937–2003), ballerina, starred in the film Ples čarovnic (Dance of the Witches)
 Meta Vidmar (1899–1975), modern dancer, expressionist dancer, teacher

Spain
 Antonia Santiago Amador (born 1946; La Chana), flamenco dancer
 Alicia Amatriain, ballet dancer, principal dancer, Stuttgart Ballet
 Dores André, ballet dancer, principal dancer, San Francisco Ballet
 La Argentinita (1898–1945), ballet dancer, costume designer
 Elisa Badenes, ballet dancer, principal dancer, Stuttgart Ballet
 Sara Baras (born 1971), flamenco dancer
 Carmencita (1868–1910), Spanish show dancer, American music-hall ballet dancer
 La Chunga (born 1938), flamenco dancer
 Luz Chavita (1880–?), music hall ballet dancer in Paris
 Dalilah (1936–2001), flamenco dancer, oriental dancer
 Lola Flores (1923–1995), flamenco dancer, actress
 Cristina Hoyos (born 1946), flamenco dancer, choreographer, film actress
 Lucia Lacarra (born 1975), ballet dancer, former principal with Bayerisches Staatsballett
 Blanca Li (born 1964), ballet dancer, flamenco dancer, choreographer
 Pilar López Júlvez (1912–2008), show dancer, choreographer, also performed in Latin America and United States
 Sara Luzita (born 1922), ballerina, Spanish dancer, Ballet Rambert
 Juana la Macarrona (1860–1947), flamenco dancer, danced in Paris and elsewhere in Europe
 Rosita Mauri (1850–1923), prima ballerina, Paris Opera Ballet
 Itziar Mendizabal (born 1981), ballet dancer, first soloist, The Royal Ballet
 Laura Morera (born c. 1981), principal dancer, The Royal Ballet
 Arantxa Ochoa (born 1974), principal dancer, Pennsylvania Ballet
 La Belle Otero (1868–1965), show dancer, star of the Folies Bergère
 María Pagés (born 1963), flamenco dancer, choreographer, touring internationally with her Maria Pagès Company
 Tamara Rojo (born 1974), principal dancer, director, English National Ballet, formerly The Royal Ballet
 Laura del Sol (born 1961), flamenco dancer, film actress, starred in the 1983 film Carmen 
 Carmen Tórtola Valencia (1882–1955), show dancer, choreographer, costume designer, Folies Bergère
 Katita Waldo (born 1968), ballet dancer, former principal and ballet master, San Francisco Ballet
 Nadia Yanowsky, dancer, Royal New Zealand Ballet
 Zenaida Yanowsky (born 1975), former ballet dancer, principal dancer, Royal Ballet
 Angelita Vargas (born 1946), flamenco dancer
 Eva la Yerbabuena (born 1970), flamenco dancer

Sweden
 Ulrika Åberg (1771–1852), one of the first native Swedes in the Royal Swedish Ballet
Birgit Åkesson (1908–2001), choreographer, dancer, dance researcher
 Anneli Alhanko (born 1953 in Colombia), ballerina, has danced in several films
Aino Bergö (1915–1944), ballerina, opera singer
Jenny Brandt (1867–1933), ballerina
Cristina Caprioli (born 1953), choreographer
Dee Demirbag (born 1973), Turkish-born dancer and singer
Isabel Edvardsson (born 1982), dancer
Cecilia Ehrling (born 1984), competitive dancer
Jeanna Falk (1901–1980), dancer, dance teacher 
Nikisha Fogo, ballet dancer, first soloist, Vienna State Ballet
Amanda Forsberg (born 1846), ballerina
Sophie Hagman (1758–1826), ballet dancer
 Jenny Hasselquist (1894–1978), prima ballerina, Royal Ballet, acted in many silent films
 Hedda Hjortsberg (1777–1867), prima ballerina, Royal Swedish Ballet
Anna Sophia Holmstedt (1759–1807), pioneering ballet dancer
Sofia Karlsson (born 1978), modern dancer
 Sophie Karsten (1783–1862), prima ballerina, Royal Swedish Ballet, mother of Marie Taglioni
Ana Laguna (born 1955), internationally known Spanish-born Swedish ballet dancer, teacher
Efva Lilja (born 1956), choreographer
 Marie Lindqvist (born 1970), principal dancer, teacher, Royal Swedish Ballet
Gun Lund (born 1943), choreographer, dance company director
 Hilda Lund (1840–1911), prima ballerina, teacher, Royal Swedish Ballet
Sonja Lund (born 1942), dancer, actress
 Jenny Nilson (born 1973), principal dancer, Royal Swedish Ballet
 Charlotta Norberg (1824–1892), prima ballerina, teacher, student of August Bournonville, Royal Swedish Ballet
 Nathalie Nordquist (born 1979), principal, Royal Swedish Ballet
Linda Pritchard (born 1983), singer, professional dancer
 Gunhild Rosén (1855–1928), prima ballerina, choreographer, ballet master, Royal Swedish Ballet
Elsa-Marianne von Rosen (1924–2014), ballet dancer, choreographer, actress
Olga Sandberg (1844–1926), ballerina
 Nadja Sellrup (born 1977), principal dancer, Royal Swedish Ballet
 Charlotte Slottsberg (1760–1800), prima ballerina, Royal Swedish Ballet, danced with Antoine Bournonville
Carin da Silva (born 1984), singer, professional dancer
 Lisa Steier (1888–1928), prima ballerina, teacher, ballet master, Royal Swedish Ballet
Kari Sylwan (born 1940), actress, dancer, ballet teacher, choreographer
 Marie Taglioni (1804–1884), prima ballerina, Paris Opera, Imperial Ballet, first to dance en pointe
 Anna Valev (born 1969), principal dancer, Royal Swedish Ballet
Maria Westberg (1853–1893), ballerina
Jennie Widegren (born 1973), dancer, choreographer

Switzerland
 Manola Asensio (born 1943), ballet dancer
 Christine Brodbeck (born 1950), dancer
 Beatriz Consuelo (1932–2013), ballet dancer
 Nina Corti (born 1953), flamenco dancer
 Aenne Goldschmidt (1920–2020), expressionist dancer, choreographer, pedagogue
 Ursula Kübler (1928–2010), ballet dancer with Paris Opera Ballet
 Asa Lanova (1933–2017), ballet dancer
 Fabienne Liechti, professional ballroom dancer
 Julia Marcus (1905–2002), dancer, choreographer
 Suzanne Perrottet (1889–1983), dancer, movement teacher
 Norka Rouskaya, eccentric dancer

Ukraine
 Irina Dvorovenko, former ballet dancer and actress, principal dancer, American Ballet Theatre
 Masha Dashkina Maddux, modern dancer, former principal dancer with Martha Graham Dance Company
 Iana Salenko (born 1983), ballet dancer, principal dancer, Berlin State Ballet
 Christine Shevchenko (born 1988), ballet dancer, principal dancer, American Ballet Theatre
 Karina Smirnoff (born 1978), ballroom dancer, now in the United States

United Kingdom
 Louise Henderson (burlesque) (dates unknown)
 Phyllis Bedells (1893–1985), first British prima ballerina, teacher, London Empire Theatre, Covent Garden, also in musicals
 Immodesty Blaize (born c. 1978), burlesque dancer, show girl
 Teneisha Bonner (1981–2019), hip hop and street dancer
 Deborah Bull (born 1963), ballet dancer, broadcaster
 Darcey Bussell (born 1969), former ballet dancer and TV presenter, principal dancer, Royal Ballet
 Claire Calvert (born 1988), ballet dancer, first soloist, Royal Ballet
 Simone Clarke (born 1970), prima ballerina, English National Ballet
 Lesley Collier (born 1947), principal dancer, teacher, Royal Ballet
 Lauren Cuthbertson (born 1984), ballet dancer, principal dancer, Royal Ballet
 Hermione Darnborough (1915–2010), ballerina, Saddler's Wells
 Nancy Dawson (c.1728–1767), actress and dancer, famous for her hornpipe
 Viviana Durante (born 1967), see Italy
 Julia Farron (1922–2019), principal dancer, teacher, Royal Ballet
 Margot Fonteyn (1919–1991), outstanding ballerina with The Royal Ballet, frequently performed with Rudolf Nureyev
 Celia Franca (1921–2007), founder, director, National Ballet of Canada
 Maina Gielgud (born 1945), ballerina, artistic director, Australian Ballet
 Beryl Goldwyn (born 1930), prima ballerina, Ballet Rambert, The Royal Ballet
 Beryl Grey (born 1927), outstanding prima ballerina, Saddlers Wells Ballet/Royal Ballet, first western dancer to perform at the Bolshoi
 Melissa Hamilton (born 1989), ballet dancer, first soloist, Royal Ballet, former principal dancer, Semperoper Ballett
 Ruthie Henshall (born 1967), singer, dancer, actress, in West End musicals
 Lydia Cecilia Hill (1913–1940), cabaret dancer
 Francesca Hayward (born 1992), ballet dancer, principal dancer, Royal Ballet
 Paula Hinton (1924–1996), ballet dancer, wife and partner of Walter Gore
 Seeta Indrani (born 1963), theatre dancer, musicals
 Jillian La Valette (born 1934), ballroom dancer, teacher
 Stephanie Lawrence (1949–2000), singer, dancer, in West End musicals
 Perri Lister (born 1959), dancer, actress, Hot Gossip
 Mabel Love (1874–1953), burlesque dancer, singer, actress
 Gillian Lynne (1926–2018), ballerina, director, choreographer of West End musicals
 Alicia Markova (1910–2004), ballerina, choreographer, teacher, performed with the Ballets Russes and the English National Ballet
 Cathy Marston (born 1975), ballet dancer, choreographer
 Kizzy Matiakis (born 1981), baller dancer, principal dancer, Royal Danish Ballet
 Jessie Matthews (1907–1981), dancer, actress, appeared in early musicals
 Pippa Moore, ballet dancer, former premier dancer, Northern Ballet
 Yasmine Naghdi, ballet dancer, principal dancer, Royal Ballet
 Caroline O'Connor (born 1962), singer, dancer, actress, in West End musicals
 Betty Oliphant (1918–2004), ballet mistress, teacher, National Ballet of Canada
 Nancy Osbaldeston (born 1989), ballet dancer, principal dancer, Royal Ballet of Flanders
 Georgina Parkinson (1938–2009), ballet dancer, principal dancer, Royal Ballet, ballet mistress, American Ballet Theatre
 Arlene Phillips (born 1943), choreographer, West End and Broadway musicals
 Florence Pigott (died 1899), ballerina, Metropolitan Opera Company
 Marguerite Porter (born 1948), principal ballerina, choreographer, teacher, Royal Ballet
 Samantha Raine, ballet mistress and former ballet dancer, Royal Ballet
 Sophie Rebecca, ballet dancer
 Hollie Robertson (born 1985), ballroom dancer
 Anne Rogers (born 1933), actress, dancer, singer, in West End and Broadway musicals
 Gaynor Rowlands (1883–1906), ballet dancer, show dancer, actress
 Hester Santlow (c. 1690–1773), early stage dancer, actress, Drury Lane
 Valda Setterfield (born 1934), stage dancer, actress
 Antoinette Sibley (born 1939), prima ballerina, teacher, Royal Ballet
 Emma Slater (born 1988), professional dancer, choreographer
 Phyllida Crowley Smith, theatre dancer, choreographer, musicals
 Lydia Sokolova (1896–1974), ballerina, choreographer, Ballets Russes
 Peggy Spencer (1920–2016), ballroom dancer, choreographer
 Penelope Spencer (1901–1993), innovative free-style dancer and choreographer
 Laurretta Summerscales, ballet dancer, principal dancer, Bavarian State Ballet
 Lydia Thompson (1838–1908), stage dancer, burlesque actress, travelled widely across Europe and the United States
 Tracey Ullman (born 1959), actress, singer, dancer, comedian 
 Anne Woolliams (1926–1999), artistic director, ballet choreographer, dancer and teacher
 Doreen Wells (born 1937), ballerina, theatre dancer
 Beryl de Zoete (1879–1962), ballet dancer, critic, researcher

North America

Canada
Miriam Adams (born 1944), dancer, choreographer, archivist
Jennifer Alexander (1972–2007), ballet dancer
 Maud Allan (1873–1956), dancer, choreographer, famous for her Salomé dance and her Dance of the Seven Veils
 Aszure Barton, choreographer
Anik Bissonnette (born 1962), ballet dancer
Barbara Bourget (active from 1969), ballet dance, artistic director
Sally Brayley (born 1937), Canadian-American ballet dancer, coach
Ludmilla Chiriaeff (1924–1996), Soviet-born Canadian ballet dancer, choreographer, teacher
Alexandra Denisova (born c.1922), ballet dancer
Frances Chung, ballet dancer, principal dancer, San Francisco Ballet
Crystal Costa, ballet dancer, principal dancer, Hong Kong Ballet, first soloist English National Ballet
Anne Ditchburn (born 1949), ballet dancer, choreographer, actress
Celia Franca (1921–2007), founder of the National Ballet of Canada
Gail Gilmore (1937–2014), ballet dancer, actress
Chan-hon Goh (born 1969), Chinese-Canadian ballet dancer
Christa-Elizabeth Goulakos (born 1988), ice dancer
Geneviève Guérard (born 1973), ballet dancer, television host
Evelyn Hart (born 1956), ballet dancer
Vanessa Harwood (born 1947), ballet dancer, choreographer, teacher
 Melissa Hayden (1923–2006), prima ballerina, New York City Ballet
Greta Hodgkinson (born 1974), ballet dancer, former principal dancer, National Ballet of Canada
Karen Kain (born 1951), ballet dancer, artistic director
 Louise Lecavalier (born 1958), modern dancer, several films
 Ruta Lee (born 1936), actress, dancer, appeared in Seven Brides for Seven Brothers
Angela Leigh (died 2004), Ugandan-born ballerina, teacher
Elena Lobsanova, ballet dancer, principal dancer, Miami City Ballet, formerly National Ballet of Canada
Sabrina Matthews (born 1977), choreographer
Rachael McLaren, dancer, Alvin Ailey American Dance Theater
Emily Molnar (active from 2009), ballet dancer
Hope Muir, dancer, artistic director designate, National Ballet of Canada, artistic director, Charlotte Ballet
Betty Oliphant (1918–2004), co-founder of the National Ballet School of Canada
Simone Orlando (active from 1989), ballet dancer, choreographer
Jennifer Penney (born 1946), ballet dancer
Crystal Pite (born 1970), ballet dancer, choreographer
Sonia Rodriguez (born 1972), ballet dancer, principal dancer, National Ballet of Canada
Geneviève Salbaing (1922–2016), ballet dancer, choreographer, artistic director
Lynn Seymour (born 1939), ballet dancer
Lois Smith (1929–2011), ballet dancer, teacher
Mavis Staines (born 1954), ballet dancer, teacher
Iro Tembeck (1946–2004), ballet dancer, choreographer, dance historian
Veronica Tennant (born 1946), ballet dancer, filmmaker
Eva Von Gencsy (1924–2013), ballet dancer, choreographer, teacher
Jennifer Welsman (active from 1993), ballet dancer

Cuba
 Alicia Alonso (born 1921), ballerina, choreographer,  active in New York's American Ballet Theatre and in Russia, director of the Ballet Nacional de Cuba
 Loipa Araújo (born 1941), prima ballerina and ballet mistress at the Cuban National Ballet; Associate Artistic Director of the English National Ballet; one of the "four jewels of Cuban ballet"
 Sadaise Arencibia, star dancer at the Cuban National Ballet since 2009
 Aurora Bosch (born 1942), prima ballerina and ballet mistress at the Cuban National Ballet; one of the "four jewels of Cuban ballet"
 Lorena Feijóo, ballet dancer, former principal dancer, San Francisco Ballet
 Lorna Feijóo, ballet dancer, former principal dancer, Boston Ballet
 Alicia Parla (1914–1998), rhumba dancer
 Josefina Méndez (1941–2007), prima ballerina and ballet mistress at the Cuban National Ballet; one of the "four jewels of Cuban ballet"; professor of ballet at National Art Schools (Cuba)
 Mirta Plá (1940–2003), prima ballerina of the Cuban National Ballet; one of the "four jewels of Cuban ballet"
 Mijaela Tesleoanu (1942–2011), see Romania

Mexico
 Elisa Carrillo Cabrera (born 1981), ballet dancer, principal dancer, Berlin State Ballet
 Gloria Mestre (1928–2012), Prima ballerina assoluta at Teatro di San Carlo in Naples
 Maclovia Ruiz (1910–2005), ballet dancer, show dancer, flamenco dancer, performed with San Francisco Ballet
 Brenda Velez (born 1979), ballet dancer known for performing Giselle at Teatro Degollado and owning VIA DANZA
 Lola Yberri (fl 1905), vaudeville dancer

United States

 Stella Abrera, ballet dancer, former principal dancer, American Ballet Theatre
 Precious Adams, ballet dancer, English National Ballet
 Edith Allard (born 1927), ballerina, soloist in Europe
 Gladys Bailin (born 1930), dancer and choreographer, Henry Street Playhouse
 Louise Alexander, Apache dancer, temptress dancer, social exhibition dancer
 Heléne Alexopoulos, ballet dancer, principal dancer, New York City Ballet
 Lauren Anderson (born 1965), African American ballerina, Houston Ballet
 Alexandra Ansanelli (born 1980), principal dancer, New York City Ballet, Royal Ballet
 Aesha Ash (born 1977), ballet dancer
 Merrill Ashley (born 1950), ballet dancer, principal dancer, New York City Ballet
 Debra Austin (born 1955), principal dancer, Pennsylvania Ballet
 Caroline Baldwin (born 1990), ballet dancer, principal dancer, Royal Danish Ballet
 Melissa Barak (born 1979), ballerina, choreographer, Los Angeles Ballet
 Shura Baryshnikov (born 1981), dancer, choreographer, educator
 Barbara Bears (born 1971), principal dancer, choreographer, Houston Ballet
 Margery Beddow (1931–2010), dancer, choreographer, Broadway musicals
 Stella Bloch (1897–1999), artist, dancer, journalist
 Bella Blue (born 1982), burlesque dancer
 Olivia Boisson, ballet dancer, New York City Ballet
 Chrystelle Trump Bond, American dancer, choreographer, and dance historian
 Ashley Bouder (born 1983), ballet dancer, principal dancer, New York City Ballet
 Anise Boyer (1914–2008), Cotton Club chorine, traveled with Cab Calloway's band
 Isabella Boylston (born c. 1986), ballet dancer, principal dancer, American Ballet Theatre
 Skylar Brandt (born 1993), ballet dancer, principal dancer, American Ballet Theatre
 Rachel Brice (born 1972), belly dancer
 Danielle Brown (born late 1980s), principal dancer, Sarasota Ballet
 Tener Brown (born 1960), ballet dancer, teacher, New Jersey Ballet
 Harriet Browne (1932–1997), tap dancer, choreographer
 Leslie Browne (born 1957), dancer, actress, musicals
 Jean Butler (born 1971), show dancer, choreographer, created female role in the Irish Riverdance
 Maria Calegari (born 1957), ballet dancer, principal dancer, New York City Ballet
 Lucia Chase (1897–1986), dancer, actress, co-founder of American Ballet Theatre
 Yvonne Chouteau (born 1929), dancer, Ballet Russe de Monte Carlo, co-founder of University of Oklahoma School of Dance
 Lia Cirio, dancer, principal dancer, Boston Ballet
 Natalia Clare (1919–1995), dancer with Ballet Russe de Monte Carlo, founder of Ballet la Jeunesse 
 Bessie Clayton (c. 1875–1948), show dancer, choreographer of the Gay Nineties
 Janet Collins (1917–2003), Broadway ballet dancer, choreographer, teacher
 Kathleen Breen Combes, ballet dancer, principal dancer with Boston Ballet
 Misty Copeland (born 1982), ballet dancer, soloist with the American Ballet Theatre
 Lillian Covillo (1921–2010), ballet dancer, co-founder of the Colorado Ballet
 J'aime Crandall (born 1982), ballet dancer, principal dancer, Royal Danish Ballet
 Alexandra Danilova (1903–1997), see Russian female dancers
 Mary Day (1910–2006), ballet teacher
 Gemze de Lappe (1922–2017), dancer, choreographer, teacher, musicals
 Carmen De Lavallade (born 1931), dancer, choreographer, actress
 Agnes de Mille (1905–1993), ballet dancer, contemporary dancer, choreographer, musicals
 Patricia Delgado, ballet dancer, répétiteur, teacher, former principal dancer, Miami City Ballet
 Michaela DePrince (born 1995), soloist ballet dancer for the Dutch National Ballet
 Marguerite Derricks (born 1961), ballerina, choreographer, musicals
 Sasha De Sola, ballet dancer, principal dancer, San Francisco Ballet
 Jeanne Devereaux (1912–2011), prima ballerina, choreographer
 Julie Diana, ballet dancer, writer and arts administrator, former principal dancer, San Francisco Ballet and Pennsylvania Ballet, executive director, American Repertory Ballet
 Holly Dorger, ballet dancer, principal dancer, Royal Danish Ballet
 Isadora Duncan (1877–1927), innovative dancer preferring natural movement to ballet, opened dance school in Grunewald, Germany
 Katherine Dunham (1909–2006), dancer, choreographer, author, educator and social activist.
 Ashley Ellis, ballet dancer, principal dancer, Boston Ballet
 Eva Evdokimova (1948–2009), ballerina, teacher, active in the Royal Danish Ballet and the Berlin State Ballet
 Suzanne Farrell (born 1945), ballet dancer, founder of Suzanne Farrell Ballet
 Chyrstyn Fentroy, ballet dancer, second soloist with Boston Ballet
 Kelli Finglass (born 1964), dancer, director
 Katherine Flowers (1896–1982), African-American dancer, choreographer, teacher and researcher
 Amy Fote (born 1972), principal dancer, Houston Ballet
 Loie Fuller (1862–1928), pioneer of modern dance, own natural movement and improvisation techniques, also choreographer, Folies Bergères
 Annabelle Gamson (born 1928), modern dancer, Broadway musicals
 Robin Gee, dancer, educator, choreographer
 Angelica Generosa, ballet dancer, principal dancer, Pacific Northwest Ballet
 Alicia Graf Mack, dancer and teacher, director of dance division, Juilliard School
 Martha Graham (1894–1991), modern dancer, choreographer, pioneer of modern dance, Folies Bergère
 Jill Green, dance scholar, educator
 Cynthia Gregory (born 1946), prima ballerina, American Ballet Theatre
 Francesca Harper (born 1969), dancer and choreographer, founder of The Francesca Harper Project
 Mireille Hassenboehler (born c. 1973), principal dancer, Houston Ballet
 Sarah Hay (born 1987), ballet dancer and actress
 Susan Hendl (1947–2020), ballet dancer and répétiteur, New York City Ballet
 Rosella Hightower (1920–2008), ballet dancer, Grand Ballet de Monte Carlo, directed several French ballet companies
 Harriet Hoctor (1905–1977), ballerina, teacher, actress, Hollywood movies
 Ana Paula Höfling, dancer, dance scholar, capoeirista 
 Melissa Hough, ballet dancer, principal dancer, Norwegian National Ballet, previously Boston Ballet and Houston Ballet
 Catheirne Hurlin, American ballet dancer, soloist, American Ballet Theatre
 Doris Humphrey (1895–1958), influential modern dancer, choreographer, teacher
 Sterling Hyltin (born 1985), ballet dancer, principal dancer, New York City Ballet
 Carrie Imler, ballet dancer, former principal dancer, Pacific Northwest Ballet
 Janet Jackson (born 1966), singer, show dancer, rock, hip hop
 Drew Jacoby (born 1984), contemporary ballet dancer, principal dancer, Royal Ballet of Flanders
 Susan Jaffe (born 1962), ballerina, ballet mistress, American Ballet Theatre
 Whitney Jensen (born 1992), ballet dancer, Norwegian National Ballet, formerly Boston Ballet
 Emily Johnson (born 1976), Native American modern dancer, choreographer, artistic director
 Allegra Kent (born 1937), ballet dancer, actress, New York City Ballet
 Julie Kent (born 1969), ballet dancer and director, former principal dancer, American Ballet Theatre, artistic director, The Washington Ballet
 Gelsey Kirkland (born 1952), principal dancer, New York City Ballet
 Darci Kistler (born 1964), principal dancer, New York City Ballet
 Maria Kowroski (born 1976), ballet dancer, principal dancer, New York City Ballet
 Rebecca Krohn, former ballet dancer, ballet master and former principal dancer, New York City Ballet
 Sarah Lamb (born 1980), ballet dancer, principal dancer, The Royal Ballet
 Katherine LaNasa (born 1966), film actress, ballet dancer, choreographer
 Sarah Lane (born 1984), ballet dancer, former principal dancer, American Ballet Theatre
 Moscelyne Larkin (1925–2012), ballet dancer, founder of the Tulsa Ballet
 Tina LeBlanc (born 1966), ballet dancer, teacher and ballet master, former principal dancer, San Francisco Ballet
 Emery LeCrone, dancer, choreographer
 Megan LeCrone, ballet dancer, soloist with New York City Ballet
 Sara Leland (1941–2020), ballet dancer, principal and assistant balletmaster, New York City Ballet
 Kylie Shea Lewallen (born 1986), ballet dancer, former principal dancer with Spectrum Dance Theater
 Janet Lilly, modern dancer, choreographer, former principal dancer of Bill T. Jones/Arnie Zane Dance Company
 Jennifer Lopez (born 1969), film actress, show dancer, choreographer, Latin dance
 Lauren Lovette (born 1993), ballet dancer, choreographer, principal dancer, New York City Ballet
 Annabelle Lyon (1916–2011), ballet dancer, American Ballet
 Kathi Martuza (born c. 1979), principal dancer, Oregon Ballet Theatre
 Maryhelen Mayfield (born 1946), ballet dancer, Kansas City Ballet
 Kay Mazzo (born 1946), ballet dancer and educator, principal dancer, New York City Ballet, Chairman of Faculty, School of American Ballet
 Patricia McBride (born 1942), principal dancer, New York City Ballet
 Joan McCracken (1917–1961), actress, dancer, comedian in Broadway shows
 Sara Mearns (born 1983), ballet dancer, principal dancer, New York City Ballet
 Melody Mennite (born c. 1983), principal dancer, Houston Ballet
 Beth Mitchell (1972–1998), shag dancer
 Merritt Moore (born 1988), ballet dancer, quantum physicist, completing residency at Harvard University's ArtLab
 Kathryn Morgan (born 1989), ballet dancer, former soloist with New York City Ballet
 Mary Ellen Moylan (1925–2020), ballet dancer, Ballet Russe de Monte Carlo, Ballet Society, Ballet Theatre and Metropolitan Opera Ballet
 Gillian Murphy (born 1979), ballet dancer, principal dancer, American Ballet Theatre
 Patricia Neary (born 1942), international prima ballerina, choreographer, ballet director, specializing in the ballets of George Balanchine
 Kyra Nichols (born 1958), ballet dancer and teacher, former principal dancer, New York City Ballet
 Georgina Pazcoguin, ballet dancer and actress, soloist, New York City Ballet
 Noelani Pantastico (born 1980), ballet dancer, principal dancer, Pacific Northwest Ballet, formerly Les Ballets de Monte Carlo
 Tiler Peck (born 1989), ballet dancer, principal dancer, New York City Ballet
 Unity Phelan, ballet dancer, soloist, New York City Ballet
 Valarie Pettiford, Fosse
 Juanita Pitts, tap dancer
 Eleanor Powell (1912–1982), dancer and actress
 Pearl Primus (1919–1994), dancer, choreographer and anthropologist, pioneer of African dance in the US
 Katy Pyle, ballet dancer, director, founder of Ballez
 Teresa Reichlen, ballet dancer, principal dancer, New York City Ballet
 Jenifer Ringer, ballet dancer and teacher, former principal dancer, New York City Ballet, Dean of Colburn School's Trudl Zipper Dance Institute.
 Alison Roper (born 1974), principal dancer, Oregon Ballet Theatre
 Ruth St. Denis (1879–1968), pioneer of modern dance, Oriental dance as an expression of spiritualism
 Stephanie Saland, former ballet dancer and teacher, principal dancer, New York City Ballet
 Amanda Schull (born 1978), former ballet dancer and actress, San Francisco Ballet
 Terry Sendgraff, dancer, choreographer
 Rosy Simas (Seneca Nation of Indians) (born 1967), Native American choreographer, dancer
 Karina Smirnoff (born 1978), see Ukraine
 Molly Smolen, principal dancer with Birmingham Royal Ballet since 1999
 Jennie Somogyi, ballet dancer, former principal dancer, New York City Ballet
 Abi Stafford, ballet dancer, principal dancer, New York City Ballet
 Llanchie Stevenson, ballet dancer
 Beatriz Stix-Brunell (born 1993), ballet dancer, first soloist, Royal Ballet
 B.J. Sullivan, dancer, choreographer, educator
 Maria Tallchief (1925–2013), Native American prima ballerina with George Balanchine at New York City Ballet
 Marjorie Tallchief (born 1926), first American to be "première danseuse étoile" at the Paris Opera Ballet
 Helen Tamiris (1905–1966), pioneer of modern dance, contributing to the choreography of early musicals
 Janie Taylor, ballet dancer, L.A. Dance Project, former principal dancer, New York City Ballet
 Devon Teuscher (born 1989), ballet dancer, principal dancer, American Ballet Theatre
 Twyla Tharp (born 1942), dancer, choreographer
 Justin Tornow, dancer, choreographer, educator
 Judy Trammell (born 1958), dancer, choreographer
 Cassandra Trenary, ballet dancer, principal dancer, American Ballet Theatre
 Tracey Ullman (born 1959), actress, singer, dancer, comedian
 Jan Van Dyke (1941–2015), dancer, choreographer, educator
 Sarah Van Patten (born 1984), ballet dancer, principal dancer, San Francisco Ballet
 Lea Ved (born 1991), contemporary dancer, soloist, Royal Swedish Ballet and Nederlands Dans Theater
 Laura Vikmanis (born 1968), dancer
 Jocelyn Vollmar (born 1925), ballet dancer, San Francisco Ballet, principal with New York City Ballet
 Dita Von Teese (born 1972), burlesque dancer
 Sydney Magruder Washington, ballet dancer
 Alexandra Waterbury, ballet dancer, former student at the School of American Ballet
 Amy Watson (born 1981), principal dancer, Royal Danish Ballet
 Heather Watts (born 1953), principal dancer, New York City Ballet
 Sara Webb (born 1979), principal dancer, Houston Ballet
 Miranda Weese, ballet dancer, former principal dancer, New York City Ballet and Pacific Northwest Ballet
 Wendy Whelan (born 1967), ballet dancer, associate artistic director and former principal dancer, New York City Ballet
 Michele Wiles (born c. 1980), principal dancer, American Ballet Theatre
 Sallie Wilson (1932–2008), ballet dancer, American Ballet Theatre, ballet mistress New York Theatre Ballet
 Serena Wilson (1933–2007), belly dancer, teacher
 Joy Womack (born 1994), ballet dancer, artist, Boston Ballet
 Ann Woodward (1915–1975), showgirl
 Vanessa Zahorian, former ballet dancer, principal dancer, San Francisco Ballet
 Lila Zali (1918–2003), see Georgia
 Bridgett Zehr (born c. 1985), principal dancer, National Ballet of Canada, English National Ballet
Maddie Ziegler (born 2002), internet celebrity and Dance Moms cast member
Mackenzie Ziegler (born 2004), social media influencer, Dance Moms cast member, The Masked Dancer contestant

Puerto Rico

 Lourdes Chacón (born 1950), exotic dancer, singer
 Rita Moreno (born 1931), actress, dancer, singer

South America

Argentina
 Esmeralda Agoglia (born 1923), prima ballerina, choreographer, director, Teatro Colón
 Carolina Agüero (born 1975), ballet dancer
 Susana Agüero (1944–2012), ballerina, Teatro Colón, Lyon Opera Ballet
 Valeria Archimó (born 1972), show dancer, choreographer, director
 La Argentina (1890–1936), show dancer, gypsy-style dancer, Moulin Rouge
 Carmencita Calderón (1905–2005), tango dancer
 Eleonora Cassano (born 1965), ballerina, modern dancer, Teatro Colón, musicals
 Erica Cornejo, ballet dancer, former principal dancer, Boston Ballet
 Olga Ferri (1928–2012), ballerina, Teatro Colón
 Norma Fontenla (1930–1971), prima ballerina, Teatro Colón, died in plane crash
 Adabel Guerrero (born 1978), ballet dancer, show dancer, actress
 Paloma Herrera (born 1975), former ballet dancer, principal dancer, American Ballet Theatre
 Natalia Magnicaballi, principal dancer since 1999, Suzanne Farrell Ballet
 Lida Martinoli (1914–1991), ballet dancer, choreographer, actress, Teatro Colón
 Tita Merello (1904–2002), tango dancer, film actress
 Mariana Montes (born 1979), Argentine tango dancer, teacher
 María Nieves (born 1938), Argentine tango dancer
 Marianela Núñez (born 1982), ballet dancer, principal dancer, The Royal Ballet
 Ludmila Pagliero (born 1983), ballet dancer, étoile with the Paris Opera Ballet
 María Ruanova (1912–1976), prima ballerina, choreographer, teacher, Teatro Colón, first Argentine ballet dancer to gain international recognition

Brazil
 Mercedes Baptista (1921–2014), ballet dancer, choreographer
 Adriana Bombom (born 1974), show dancer, actress
 Sonia Destre Lie, dancer, choreographer, founder and director of the hip hop group Companhia Urbana de Dança
 Marcia Haydée (born 1937), prima ballerina, director, Stuttgart Ballet, Santiago Ballet
 Carla Körbes (born c. 1981), former ballet dancer, principal dancer, Pacific Northwest Ballet
 Mayara Magri, ballet dancer, first soloist, Royal Ballet
 Roberta Marquez (born 1977), former ballet dancer, principal dancer, Royal Ballet
 Tuany Nascimento, ballet dancer, dance teacher
 Fernanda Oliveira (born 1980), baller dancer, lead principal, English National Ballet
 Ingrid Silva, ballet dancer, Dance Theatre of Harlem
 Julia Goldani Telles (born 1995), ballerina, actress, now in the United States

Chile
 Yamna Lobos (born 1983), Chilean folk dancer, actress

Colombia
 Sonia Osorio (1928–2011), ballerina and choreographer

Peru
 Tati Alcántara, actress, dancer, choreographer, musicals
 Helba Huara, (1900–1986) dancer, choreographer

Uruguay
 Eunice Castro (born 1976), model and theatre dancer
 Virginia Dobrich (born 1983), dancer, actress and model
 Tina Ferreira, Afro-Uruguayan, dancer, journalist and vedette of both theater and carnival
 Graciela Figueroa, dancer and choreographer
 Laura Martínez (born 1964), actress, dancer and television star
 Berta Pereira (born 1958), percussionist and dancer
 Maria Riccetto (born c. 1980), ballet dancer, American Ballet Theatre, Ballet Nacional del Sodre
 Flor de María Rodríguez (1913–2001), ballerina, choreographer and folklorist

See also
 Women in dance
 List of dancers
 List of Indian women in dance
 List of prima ballerinas

References

Women
List
Dancers
Dance-related lists
Lists of female dancers